Władysław Gnyś (24 August 1910 – 28 February 2000) was a Polish pilot of the Polish Air Force, a World War II flying ace and the first Polish victor in aerial combat in World War II. He briefly served as the commander of No. 317 Polish Fighter Squadron; he was shot down on his first mission over France on August 27, 1944.

In 1931, Gnyś entered military service with the Polish Air Force. In 1933 he began air training in Grudziądz and later in 1936, was a flying instructor at the Polish Air Force Academy at Dęblin. During the war he scored six victories - three solo and three shared - in the Polish and French campaigns.

The defense of Poland, September 1939
By May 1939 Gnyś had been posted to the 121st Eskadra Mysliwska (121st Fighter Escadrille) in the city of Kraków, equipped with obsolete PZL P.11c fighters. On 31 August the Squadron was assigned to operate with the III/2 Dywizjon (Group) and it relocated to a reserve airfield in Balice.

In the early morning of 1 September 1939, Gnyś was woken by a German bombing raid on Kraków. At about 7 am (according to other sources, 5:30 am) Gnyś flew a sortie with Cpt , the Group Commander. Just after take off and at about 300 meters altitude the Polish fighters were suddenly attacked by a pair of German Ju 87B dive-bombers from I/StG 2 "Immelmann". Unteroffizier Frank Neubert successfully fired at Medwecki and scored probably the first aerial victory of the war. The P-11 fell away having suffered serious damage, and Medwecki was killed. Gnyś was now also under attack, but later shot at a "Stuka" piloted by Lt. Brandenburg. The German aircraft started to smoke, but managed to return to base at Nieder-Ellguth. A few minutes later Gnyś attacked two Do 17E bombers from KG 77. After a few passes both Do 17 bombers crashed in the country village of Żurada, near Olkusz. One of the German bombers was coded "3Z+FR" on its fuselage and all six crew members were killed, one later identified as a Uffz. Klose. On his return to base Gnyś met a lone He 111, but he was out of ammunition.

There is controversy regarding these victories. The Polish Aviation Museum in Kraków has the only surviving PZL P.11c fighter from the September campaign. Among other armaments, it has four 7.92 mm machine guns. An examination of a fragment from one of the downed Dorniers revealed at least four clearly defined bullet holes having the same diameter to the ammunition on board Gnyś's PZL P.11c fighter. Taking into account the bullets' angle of entry and the resulting damage, their diameters match up within one mm of the 7.92. This would conclude that the two Do 17s were not brought down by anti-aircraft fire because shrapnel from an exploding shell does not leave neat holes, but rather jagged and irregular size punctures.

The combat in which Medwecki was shot down took place in 5:30-6:00 am and, according to Emmerling, Gnyś only fired at the Ju 87, but did not hit it, nor did he meet Do 17s. Other authors however, claim that damage to one of the Do 17s which resulted in a collision with the other, might have been caused by Gnyś. One such author, Polish aviation historian Jerzy B. Cynk, concluded that W. Gnyś was responsible for the first Allied aerial victories of the war. [see 'The Polish Air Force at War - The Official History 1939-1943' pp. 73, 75]

Gnyś scored another victory in September 1939, claiming a He 111.

France 1940 
After the fall of Poland, Gnyś fled to France and served as a pilot with the French Air Force. Flying the Morane MS 406-C with GC III./1 and stationed at Toul Croix, Gnyś scored three shared victories; a He 111 on 12 May and two Do 17s on 16 May. After the French surrender, Gnyś escaped via Oran and Casablanca and arrived in Liverpool on 14 July 1940.

With the RAF 1940-44 
Gnyś later fought with the Royal Air Force, joining No. 302 Squadron as a Pilot Officer on 17 August 1940 and seeing combat in the Battle of Britain and into 1941. On 21 May 1941 Gnyś' Hawker Hurricane was badly damaged by fighters although he managed to return to base.

Later he served with the No. 316 Polish Fighter Squadron flying Spitfires and No. 309 Polish Fighter-Reconnaissance Squadron, flying tactical reconnaissance Mustangs.

On 22 August 1944, he was appointed to the command of No. 317 Polish Fighter Squadron. Two days later, Gnyś was shot down over Rouen by flak, was wounded and captured by German forces. Despite his wounds, he escaped from a POW field hospital a few days later, found by the French Maquis and returned to the Allied lines safely.

He settled in Canada after the war.

Awards
 Croix de Guerre (France)
 Distinguished Flying Cross (United Kingdom)
 Cross of Valour (Poland) 3 times
 Silver Cross of the Order of Virtuti Militari
 Commander's Cross with Star of the Order of Polonia Restituta (2 September 1999)
 Bronze Cross of Merit (18 June 1935)

References

Bibliography
 
 Bartłomiej Belcarz: Grupa Myśliwska Montpellier 1940. Sandomierz: Wydawnictwo Stratus, 2012  
 Tadeusz Jerzy Krzystek, Anna Krzystek: Polskie Siły Powietrzne w Wielkiej Brytanii w latach 1940-1947 łącznie z Pomocniczą Lotniczą Służbą Kobiet (PLSK-WAAF). Sandomierz: Stratus, 2012, p. 199. 
 Jerzy Pawlak: Absolwenci Szkoły Orląt: 1925-1939. Warszawa: Retro-Art, 2009, p. 200. 
 Jerzy Pawlak: Polskie eskadry w Wojnie Obronnej 1939. Warszawa: Wydawnictwa Komunikacji i Łączności, 1991 
 Piotr Sikora: Asy polskiego lotnictwa. Warszawa: Oficyna Wydawnicza Alma-Press. 2014, p. 401. 
 Józef Zieliński: Lotnicy polscy w Bitwie o Wielką Brytanię. Warszawa: Oficyna Wydawnicza MH, 2005, pp. 60–61.

External links

1910 births
2000 deaths
Recipients of the Croix de Guerre 1939–1945 (France)
Polish World War II flying aces
Recipients of the Distinguished Flying Cross (United Kingdom)
Recipients of the Silver Cross of the Virtuti Militari
Recipients of the Cross of Valour (Poland)
Commanders with Star of the Order of Polonia Restituta
Recipients of the Bronze Cross of Merit (Poland)
Shot-down aviators
World War II prisoners of war held by Germany
Polish emigrants to Canada